Nagen Sarma was an Indian politician hailing from Assam. Nagen was the general secretary of Asom Gana Parishad. He was a three times MLA from Nalbari constituency and served as PWD Minister and Forest minister for the Government of Assam.

Death 
Sarma was killed in a car ambush by United Liberation Front of Asom (Ulfa).

References 

Asom Gana Parishad politicians
2000 deaths
Year of birth missing
Members of the Assam Legislative Assembly